Ekblom may refer to:

 Annette Ekblom (born 1956), English actress
 Axel Ekblom (1893–1957), Swedish sport shooter
 Elisabeth Ekblom (born 1958), former professional tennis player from Sweden
 Emil Ekblom (born 1994), Norwegian football striker
 Fredrik Ekblom (born 1970), Swedish race car driver from Kumla
 Helena Ekblom (1790–1859), Swedish writer and preacher
 Thérèse Ekblom (1867–1941), Swedish botanical and zoological illustrator
 Tommy Ekblom (born 1959), retired long-distance runner from Finland
 Ulla Ekblom (born 1943), retired Swedish athlete